Sungai Karas is a Chinese new village in Labis, Segamat District, Johor, Malaysia, 3 km south of Labis. It has about 100 houses, while two new housing areas have about 70 houses.

Economy
Most villagers are rubber tappers at their six ekar rubber trees. In the last 10 years some rubber trees were replaced by those producing palm oil. Most jobs in the rubber jungle are done by old villagers, while most young people left their home to work outside the village.

Education
There is one Chinese Primary School, SJK(C) Karas.

References

Villages in Johor
Segamat District